is a Japanese professional footballer who plays as an attacking midfielder or winger for Ligue 1 club Monaco and the Japan national team.

Minamino began his club career at J.League Division 1 club Cerezo Osaka in 2012 and in his first season he was named J.League Rookie of the Year. In 2014 he moved to Austrian club Red Bull Salzburg with whom he spent four successful seasons. Following impressive displays for the club he joined Liverpool on 1 January 2020, winning the Premier League in his inaugural season.

Making his senior international debut for Japan in 2015, Minamino starred in the team that reached the final of the 2019 AFC Asian Cup, also playing at the 2022 FIFA World Cup.

Early life
Minamino was born in Izumisano, Osaka Prefecture. While at elementary school, he played for the local club Sessel Kumatori. Growing up, he was inspired by the finishing and dribbling of Brazilian striker Ronaldo, who was the top scorer at the 2002 FIFA World Cup which Japan co-hosted when Minamino was seven. He would watch videos of Ronaldo's feints, and would go outside to practice. He was also inspired by his older brother Kenta, and their father would put cones down in a car park for them to dribble in and out of at speed. He attended Osaka-Kokoku High School. Minamino described himself as an "active child" growing up.

Club career

Cerezo Osaka
Minamino joined Cerezo Osaka youth team at age 12 and progressed through the academy. While at the Cerezo academy, players such as Shinji Kagawa, were in the first team, and Minamino would watch them up close and train with them. Minamino said of the club's youth team in 2014: "At Cerezo Youth, the current physical coach of the top team was the coach during my time in the youth team, it was insanely tough, really."

In August 2009, Minamino participated Japan's U15 Club Youth Soccer Championship Tournament and helped the Cerezo Osaka's U15 side finished eighth place, as they were eliminated in the quarter-finals. Despite this, he was the top scorer of the tournament, scoring eight times. The following year, Minamino helped Cerezo Osaka's U15 team finish at the top of the Prince League Kansai and at one point, scored a hat-trick, in a 5–0 win over Kobe City Science and Technology High School on 11 April 2010. In 2011, he moved to playing for Cerezo Osaka U18s, as they participated in the Takamadomiya Cup JFA U-18 Soccer Premier League. Minamino was placed in 4th place as one of the top scorers in the tournament, scoring nine times. Minamino also helped the side reach the final of the J Youth Cup. They lost 3–1 against Nagoya Grampus U18; but nevertheless, he finished as the top scorer in the tournament, scoring thirteen times.

After spending two years progressing through Cerezo Osaka's youth system, Minamino was registered to the first team in August 2012. It was not until on 17 November 2012 that he made his Cerezo first-team debut, coming on as a substitute for Takuma Edamura, in a 3–1 loss against Omiya Ardija. Minamino made his first start for the side, playing the whole game, in a 2–2 draw against Kawasaki Frontale in the last game of the season. On 15 December 2012 he scored his first Cerezo goal, in a 4–0 win over Shimizu S-Pulse in the fourth round of the Emperor's Cup. At the end of the 2012 season, Minamino went on to make five appearances and scoring once in all competitions.

He broke into the first team in 2013 and was given the number thirteen shirt ahead of the new season. Minamino became the first player from the club's youth system to play in the opening game of the season against Albirex Niigata, which Cerezo Osaka won 1–0. Shortly after, his contract status changed to professional A, having met the requirement to play enough matches this season. Minamino continued to perform well throughout March when he set up two assists in the next two league matches before scoring his first goal of the season, in a 2–1 win over Oita Trinita in the Emperor's Cup. Minamino later scored two more goals in the Emperor's Cup before being eliminated by Urawa Red Diamonds in the quarter-finals, which he scored in the second leg. Six days after the club's elimination in the Emperor's Cup, he scored his first J.League Division 1 goal against Júbilo Iwata on 7 July 2013, becoming the youngest goal scorer for the club, as Cerezo Osaka drew 2–2. Three weeks later on 26 July 2013, Minamino scored in a friendly match against Manchester United when "he sent a 20-yard piledriver into the top of the net, giving the opposition goalkeeper Anders Lindegaard no chance at all". Following the match, his performance was praised by Manchester United players and manager David Moyes. However, during a match against Shimizu S-Pulse on 19 August 2013, he suffered a medial collateral ligament injury on his left knee and was sidelined for six weeks. It was not until on 28 September 2013 when Minamino made his first-team return, coming on as a substitute, in a 2–0 win against Júbilo Iwata. He scored in a following match, in a 2–0 win over Oita Trinita. Minamino later scored three more goals later in the 2013 season, including a brace against Urawa Red Diamonds in the last game of the season. At the end of the 2013 season, he went on to make 38 appearances and score 8 goals in all competitions. Following this, Minamino went on to win the 2013 J league best newcomer award; previous winners include Takashi Usami (2010), Hiroki Sakai (2011) and Gaku Shibasaki (2012). He also signed a contract extension with the club.

At the start of the 2014 season, Minamino made his AFC Champions League debut in a 1–1 draw against Pohang Steelers. Three weeks later on 18 March 2014, he scored his first goals of the AFC Champions League, in a 4–0 win over Buriram United. However, in a 2–0 loss against Pohang Steelers on 16 April 2014, he received a straight red card in the 41st minute for a professional foul. It was not until on 12 July 2014 when Minamino scored his first goal in four months, in a 4–2 win over Veertien Mie in the second round of the Emperor's Cup. However, during a match against Kawasaki Frontale on 15 July 2014, he was then sent off for a professional foul once again, as they lost 3–1. After the match, Minamino apologised on his Twitter account for his action that got him sent off. During a 0–0 draw against Ventforet Kofu on 23 July 2014, Minamino's performance was the subject of criticism when he struggled to defend despite playing in the left-wing position; prompting apology on his Twitter account once again. A month later on 16 August 2014, he scored his first league goal of the season, in a 5–4 loss against Kawasaki Frontale. After serving a match suspension, Minamino scored his second league goal of the season, in a 2–1 loss against Vissel Kobe on 30 August 2014. He then went on a goalscoring spree between 3 September 2014 and 10 August 2014, scoring against Kawasaki Frontfale in both legs of the J.League Cup and against Júbilo Iwata in the Emperor's Cup. However, his second and last season was a more struggling one, with the club eventually getting relegated. By the end of the 2014 season, he had made 42 appearances and scored 8 times in all competitions. In total, he made 62 J.League Division 1 appearances for Cerezo Osaka, scoring 7 league goals. Following this, Minamino was linked with a move away from the club, as several European clubs were interested in signing him.

Red Bull Salzburg

Red Bull Salzburg tracked him for a year and a half before signing him on 7 January 2015, on a contract running until 2018 with the option of a further year. Cerezo Osaka later confirmed the transfer move shortly after.

Minamino made his Red Bull Salzburg debut, where he started a match in a left-wing position before being substituted in the 64th minute, in a 2–0 win over Wiener Neustadt on 13 February 2015. After missing two matches, due to a tear on his adductor muscle, he returned from injury to make his European debut on 26 February 2015, playing the first half of a 1–3 home defeat (2–5 aggregate) to Villarreal in the second leg of the last 32 of the UEFA Europa League before being replaced by Felipe Pires. Minamino then scored his first goals for Red Bull Salzburg and set up the club's fourth goal of the game, in a 4–1 win over Admira Wacker Mödling on 4 March 2015. He later scored his first goal of the season, in a 3–0 win over SV Grödig on 2 May. Minamino later helped the side win the league for the first time in his Red Bull Salzburg career. He was featured in the final of the Austrian Cup, in a 2–0 win over Austria Wien. At the end of the 2014–15 season, Minamino went on to make 14 appearances and scoring 3 times in all competitions. During the season, he quickly established himself in the starting eleven for the club, playing in the midfield position.

In the 2015–16 season, Minamino made a good start to the season when he scored his first goal of the season, in a 7–0 win over Deutschlandsberger SC in the first round of the Austrian Cup. He then scored five goals throughout August, starting with a brace against SV Ried, Dinamo Minsk in the UEFA Europa League campaign and Sturm Graz. In a 4–2 win over SV Grödig on 12 September 2015, Minamino scored a brace before setting up the club's fourth goal of the game. He then scored two goals in two matches between 4 October 2015 and 17 October 2015 against Rapid Wien and FC Admira Wacker Mödling. However, Minamino suffered a goal drought for the next four months and it was finally ended on 28 February 2016 when he scored in a 4–1 win over Austria Wien. He later scored two more goals later in the 2015–16 season. Minamino then helped the side win the league for the second consecutive time in his Red Bull Salzburg career. Twelve days later after helping the side win the league, he came on as a substitute in the second half in the final of the Austrian Cup. At the end of the 2015–16 season, Minamino went on to make 40 appearances and scoring 13 times in all competitions.

At the start of the 2016–17 season, Minamino scored his first goal of the season, in a 3–1 win over Vorwärts Steyr in the first round of the Austrian Cup. After being away from the FC Red Bull Salzburg, due to international commitment, he scored on his return on 20 August 2016, in a 3–1 win over SV Mattersburg. Two weeks later on 11 September 2016, Minamino scored a brace, in a 4–0 win over FC Admira Wacker Mödling. He later scored three more goals, including another brace against Wolfsberger AC on 17 December 2016. Two months later on 19 February 2017, Minamino scored the first hat-trick of his Red Bull Salzburg career, in a 6–1 win over SV Ried. He played a huge role when he scored twice in a 5–0 win over FC Admira Wacker Mödling to reach the final of the Austrian Cup. Throughout the 2016–17 season, Minamino was featured in and out of the starting line-up, as he was mostly placed on the substitute bench. Despite this, he helped the side win both Austrian Cup and the league for the third consecutive time in his Red Bull Salzburg career. At the end of the 2016–17 season, Minamino went on to make 31 appearances and score 14 times in all competitions. During the season, he began to play in the striker position.

In the 2017–18 season, Minamino started the season well when he scored three goals in three different competitions against Hibernians, Deutschlandsberger SC and Wolfsberger AC. However, during a 5–1 win over St. Pölten on 20 August 2017 (which he set up the club's first goal of the game), Minamino suffered a ligament tear and was substituted in the 40th minute; and as a result, he was sidelined for six weeks). It was not until on 14 October 2017 when he made his return, coming on as a late substitute, in a 3–1 win over LASK. Minamino then scored his first goals in three months, in a 3–1 win over St. Pölten on 5 November 2017 and three weeks later on 29 November 2017, he scored again, in a 2–0 win over SV Mattersburg. At the beginning of February, Minamino signed a contract extension with the club, keeping him until 2021. He later scored three more league goals for the side, including a brace against Austria Wien on 18 March 2018. Minamino later helped Red Bull Salzburg win the league for the fourth consecutive time in his Red Bull Salzburg career. During the 2017–18 season, Salzburg had their best ever European campaign, as they finished top of their Europa League group, for a record fourth time, before beating Real Sociedad, Borussia Dortmund and Lazio (in which he scored two goals in the knockout stage against Real Sociedad and Lazio), thus making their first ever appearance in the UEFA Europa League semi-final. On 3 May 2018, he played in the Europa League semi-finals as Marseille played out a 1–2 away loss but a 3–2 aggregate win to secure a place in the UEFA Europa League Final. By the end of the 2017–18 season, Minamino had made 44 appearances and scored 11 goals in all competitions.

Having missed the start of the 2018–19 season, due to a hamstring injury, Minamino made his first appearance of the season, coming on as a late substitute, in a 3–1 win over LASK in the opening game of the season. It was not until on 14 August 2018 when he scored his first goal of the season, in a 1–0 win over KF Shkëndija in the UEFA Champions League Qualification Round, to send the side through to the next round. Minamino then added three more goals by end of September. He then scored his first European goal of the season, in a 3–1 win over Celtic on 4 October 2018. On 8 November 2018, Minamino had his first-half hat-trick in a 5–2 victory over Rosenborg in a 2018–19 UEFA Europa League Group B match. Following the match, he was named in the UEFA Europa League Team of the Week. This was followed up by scoring three days later on 11 November 2018, as well as, setting up the first goal of the game, in a 2–0 win over Austria Wien. By the end of 2018, Minamino scored eleven goals in competitions for the side. Once again, he went three months without scoring and this ended when he scored and set up a goal for Mu'nas Dabbur to score his second goal and went on to score a hat-trick in a 5–1 win over Austria Wien on 31 March 2019. The following month, Minamino scored two more goals, including one against Grazer AK, which saw Red Bull Salzburg reach the Austrian Cup final. He helped the side win the league for the fifth consecutive time in his Red Bull Salzburg career. Despite being placed on the substitute bench for the Austrian Cup final, the club won 2–0 against Rapid Wien. By the end of the 2018–19 season, Minamino had made 45 appearances and scored 14 goals in all competitions. During the 2018–19 season, he continued to play in various positions in the attack.

At the start of the 2019–20 season, Minamino started the season well when he went on a scoring spree, resulting in him scoring four goals. In a UEFA Champions League match against Genk, he played a role when he set up two goals in a 6–2 win. Over the next two weeks, Minamino scored two more goals in Austrian Cup and UEFA Champions League match against Rapid Wien and Liverpool respectively. He later scored two goals in two matches between 23 November 2019 and 27 November 2019 against St. Pölten and Genk. Minamino scored his ninth goal of the season, in a 5–1 win over WSG Swarovski Tirol on 7 December 2019, in what turned out to be his last appearance for the club.

Liverpool
In December 2019, Liverpool agreed to a deal to sign Minamino from Salzburg in January 2020 after activating his £7.25 million release clause, making him the first Japanese player to play for the club. Salzburg's sporting director Christoph Freund commented that "The big clubs have been watching him and, if I was them, I'd have no hesitation to sign him. Takumi is ready to make the next step in January." On 18 December 2019, he had his Liverpool medical in preparation for his 1 January 2020 transfer to the team.

On 5 January 2020, Minamino made his Liverpool debut in the club's FA Cup win over Everton, and made his Premier League debut against Wolverhampton Wanderers, coming on in the first half for Sadio Mané on 23 January. On 29 August, Minamino came on as a substitute, replacing Neco Williams, to score his first ever goal for Liverpool at the 73rd minute, and then to score the 4th penalty in the following penalty shoot-out, in the 2020 FA Community Shield against Arsenal. On 19 December, Minamino scored his first league goal for Liverpool, as he scored the opener in a 7–0 away win over Crystal Palace.

Southampton (loan)
On 1 February 2021, Minamino signed for Southampton on loan for the remainder of the 2020–21 season. Five days later, Minamino scored on his debut for the Saints in a 2–3 away league defeat by Newcastle United.  He went on to feature ten times for Saints until the end of the season, in the Premier League. He rejoined Liverpool for the 2021–22 season.

2021–22 season

On 20 November 2021, Minamino netted his first goal at Anfield for Liverpool in a 4–0 home win against Arsenal. On 22 December 2021, Minamino scored the last-minute equaliser against Leicester City in the EFL Cup. The match eventually went to a penalty shoot-out, and although Minamino missed his penalty, Liverpool went through 5–4 on penalties. Minamino was an unused substitute as Liverpool went on to win the competition by defeating Chelsea 10–11 on penalties at the final on 27 February, with the game ending 0–0 after extra time.

On 6 February 2022, Minamino scored in a 3–1 win against Cardiff City in the FA Cup fourth round, and two goals in the fifth round to take Liverpool to the quarter-finals. Liverpool went on to win the competition on 15 May by defeating Chelsea in the final, which ended in a 0–0 draw after extra time and Liverpool winning 5–6 in the penalty shoot-out, although Minamino was not named in Liverpool's matchday squad.

Monaco 
On 28 June 2022, Monaco announced that Minamino signed a four-year contract until June 2026, worth a fixed €15m (£12.9m) and €3m (£2.6m) in add-ons. He took part in only 10 matches during the first half of the season, scoring one goal and one assist in the same match, a 3–0 away win against Stade de Reims.

International career

Youth career
Minamino previously represented the Japan U15 and U16 sides. At one point, while playing for Japan U16, he was called up for the AFC U-16 Championship tournament. Minamino helped the side reach the knockout stage, having scored three times in the Group stage, including a brace against Vietnam U16. He then scored in a 3–1 win over Iraq U16 in the quarter-finals. However, Japan U16 were eliminated by North Korea U16 in the semi-finals, as they lost 2–1, during which, Minamino scored the national side's only goal of the match. Despite this, he finished the tournament's top scorer, alongside Timur Khakimov.

In June 2011, Minamino selected for the Japan U-17 national team for the 2011 U-17 World Cup. He played four matches and scored a goal against New Zealand U17.

In October 2014, Minamino was called up by Japan U19 for the AFC U-19 Championship, leading him to withdraw from Cerezo Osaka's first team for three matches. He scored the opening goal in Matchday One of the Group stage, in a 2–1 loss against China U19. Minamino later scored two more goals in Matchday Three of the Group stage, in a 2–1 win over South Korea U19 to send through to the knockout stage. However, in the quarter-finals of the AFC U-19 Championship against North Korea U19, Minamino scored an equaliser from a penalty, leading the match to go extra time and penalty shoot-out; which he missed the decisive penalty, leading North Korea U19 to go through. Despite this, Minamino scored four goals in the tournament.

In January 2016, Minamino was called up by Japan U23 for the AFC U-23 Championship in Qatar. He was featured all the matches in the tournament and helped Japan U23 reach the final after beating Iraq U23 2–1 in the semi-finals. However, Minamino was not featured in the final against South Korea, as he was recalled back to the first team by Red Bull Salzburg, as Japan won the tournament for the first time after winning 3–2 in the game.

In August 2016, Minamino selected for the Japan U-23 team for the 2016 Summer Olympics. He played all 3 matches and scored a goal against Nigeria.

Senior career
In May 2014, Minamino was included in the Japan national team for the preliminary 30-man squad for the FIFA World Cup in Brazil. However, he failed to make the cut.

Minamino made his debut for Japan in a friendly against Iran on 13 October 2015, coming on as a substitute in 87th minute, in a 1–1 draw. A month later on 17 November 2015, he made his second appearance for Japan in a FIFA World Cup qualification match against Cambodia, coming on as a substitute in the 86th minute, in a 2–0 win. Minamino was called up from the senior national team for the first time in three years. He scored his first Japan goal, in a 3–0 win over Costa Rica on 11 September 2018. This was followed by scoring against Panama and a brace against Uruguay.

In December 2018, Minamino was one of 23 Japanese players selected for the 2019 AFC Asian Cup. In January 2019, he made his Asian Cup debut against Turkmenistan, providing an assist. In the semi-final against Iran, Minamino assisted twice and won Japan a penalty, which was successfully converted by Yuya Osako. He scored his first ever Asian Cup goal in the final against Qatar, but ended up losing 3–1. Minamino made a total of 6 appearances in the tournament. Minamino went on to score five more goals by the end of 2019.

Style of play

At Salzburg, Minamino was played in a fluid attacking role that allowed him to move freely and 'unlock doors, pick a pass and move with an elegant gait.'

His comparatively slight frame has been described as an 'advantage' as his low centre-of-gravity means he can 'run past players with ease.'

Liverpool manager Jürgen Klopp has heaped praise on him, saying, prior to him signing for Liverpool, 'I'd like to have Minamino in Liverpool. He's classy. The best talent.' After a game against Ajax in the Champions League, Klopp said 'He's everywhere, he defends like a devil and then offensively he's really involved.'

Personal life
It was announced on 14 January 2014 that Minamino held the Guinness World Record for high fives in a minute whilst running at the Komagawa Shopping Street with an achievement of 187 times, making the new world record. In addition to speaking Japanese, he speaks German since moving to Red Bull Salzburg.

Minamino is affectionally called "Taki" (derived from first name Takumi) by his teammates.

Career statistics

Club

International

Japan score listed first, score column indicates score after each Minamino goal

Honours
Red Bull Salzburg
Austrian Bundesliga: 2014–15, 2015–16, 2016–17, 2017–18, 2018–19, 2019–20
Austrian Cup: 2014–15, 2015–16, 2016–17, 2018–19

Liverpool
Premier League: 2019–20
FA Cup: 2021–22
EFL Cup: 2021–22
UEFA Champions League runner up: 2021–22

Japan U23
AFC U-23 Asian Championship: 2016

Japan
AFC Asian Cup runner-up: 2019

Individual
J.League Rookie of the Year: 2013
Japan Professional Sports Grand Prize's Rookie Award: 2013
IFFHS AFC Man Team of the Year: 2020

References

External links

Profile at the AS Monaco FC website
Profile at the Japan Football Association website

1995 births
Living people
People from Izumisano
Association football people from Osaka Prefecture
Japanese footballers
Association football midfielders
Cerezo Osaka players
FC Red Bull Salzburg players
Liverpool F.C. players
Southampton F.C. players
AS Monaco FC players
J1 League players
Austrian Football Bundesliga players
Premier League players
Ligue 1 players
Japan youth international footballers
Japan under-20 international footballers
Japan international footballers
2019 AFC Asian Cup players
2022 FIFA World Cup players
Olympic footballers of Japan
Footballers at the 2016 Summer Olympics
Japanese expatriate footballers
Expatriate footballers in Austria
Expatriate footballers in England
Expatriate footballers in France
Expatriate footballers in Monaco
Japanese expatriate sportspeople in Austria
Japanese expatriate sportspeople in England
Japanese expatriate sportspeople in France